Jonnie Marie Sánchez (born 28 January 2002) is an American-born Nicaraguan footballer who plays as a defender for the Nicaragua women's national team.

Early life
Sánchez was raised in Eastvale, California.

College career
Sánchez has verbally committed to the Southern Utah University.

International career
Sánchez capped for Nicaragua at senior level during the 2018 CONCACAF Women's Championship qualification and the 2020 CONCACAF Women's Olympic Qualifying Championship qualification.

References 

2002 births
Living people
People with acquired Nicaraguan citizenship
Nicaraguan women's footballers
Women's association football defenders
Nicaragua women's international footballers
People from Eastvale, California
Sportspeople from Riverside County, California
Sportspeople from California
American women's soccer players
Women's association football midfielders
American people of Nicaraguan descent
21st-century American women
Chaffey College alumni
College women's soccer players in the United States